Kouadio Georges Ehui (born 2 February 1994) is an Ivorian-born English footballer who plays as a midfielder for Marlow, having previously played for Wycombe Wanderers in Football League Two.

Career

Wycombe Wanderers
Ehui started a two-year scholarship with Wycombe Wanderers in 2011. He finished his first year as a scholar and signed his first professional contract in July 2012. He made his professional debut on 24 November 2012, in a 3–0 victory over Burton Albion in Football League Two, coming on as a substitute for Josh Scowen. He made his second league appearance against Cheltenham Town. Ehui moved on loan to Eastbourne Borough in 2013, making four appearances.

Non-League moves
Ehui has since had spells with Corby Town, Wealdstone, Margate, A.F.C. Hayes, Hadley and Burnham. However, in late December 2015, Ehui signed for Northwood - joining up with his cousin Joakim. Incidentally, his other cousin Ismael also had a spell at Northwood between 2014–15.

Ehui would leave Northwood in September 2016 to sign for league counterparts Aylesbury.
In 2016, Ehui signed for fellow Southern League members Hanwell Town and later in the season signed for fellow Southern League team  Egham Town.

Ehui has since had spells with Chalfont St Peter, Hertford Town, Waltham Abbey and Marlow.

Personal life
Ehui's older cousins Ismael and Joakim are also footballers.

References

External links

Georges Ehui profile at Aylesbury United
Margate statistics at Margate FC

1994 births
Living people
English footballers
Association football midfielders
Wycombe Wanderers F.C. players
Eastbourne Borough F.C. players
Corby Town F.C. players
Wealdstone F.C. players
Margate F.C. players
A.F.C. Hayes players
Hadley F.C. players
Burnham F.C. players
Northwood F.C. players
Oxhey Jets F.C. players
Aylesbury F.C. players
Hanwell Town F.C. players
Egham Town F.C. players
Chalfont St Peter A.F.C. players
Hertford Town F.C. players
Waltham Abbey F.C. players
Marlow F.C. players
English Football League players
National League (English football) players
Isthmian League players
Southern Football League players